Jamaica made its Paralympic Games début at the 1968 Summer Paralympics in Tel Aviv. It competed again in 1972, was absent in 1976, returned in 1980, and has competed at every edition of the Summer Paralympics since then. Jamaica has never taken part in the Winter Paralympics.

Jamaican competitors have won a total of 54 Paralympic medals: 20 gold, 16 silver and 18 bronze. This puts it in 44th place on the all-time Paralympic Games medal table.

Jamaica's success has declined sharply over the years, from a peak of 8 gold medals, 3 silver and 7 bronze in 1972, to just 1 bronze in 2008. Jamaica's gold medallists are Baracatt (full name not recorded; women's precision javelin, 1968); Excell (full name not recorded; men's club throw, 1968); Meikle (full name not recorded; women's 50m breaststroke, 1968); Patrick Reid (men's discus and pentathlon, men's 25m breaststroke, 1972); Rohne (full name not recorded; women's 60m wheelchair race, 1972); Leone Williams (women's discus, 1972; women's discus and shot put, 1980); Nella McPherson (women's 3x25m medley and 50m breaststroke, 1972); Pearson (full name not recorded; men's featherweight (weightlifting), 1972); Henriette Davis (women's shot put, 1980); Davis Jeffreson (men's javelin, 1980); Sarah Newland (women's 100m race, women's 100m breaststroke, 1980); Minette Wilson (women's club throw, 1980; women's javelin, 1988); and Alphanso Cunningham (men's discus, 2004).

Medal tally

Medalists

See also
 Jamaica at the Olympics

References